The 1932 Fordham Rams football team was an American football team that represented Fordham University as an independent during the 1932 college football season. In its sixth year under head coach Frank Cavanaugh, Fordham compiled a 6–2 record, shut out five of eight opponents, and outscored all opponents by a total of 193 to 28.

Schedule

References

Fordham
Fordham Rams football seasons
Fordham Rams football